Tiki Gardens was a South Seas Polynesian theme park in Indian Shores, Florida. The park, which opened in 1964, was closed in the 1980s and sold by the owners, "Trader" Frank Byars and Wahine Jo Byars, to a developer who planned to build a hotel on the large property. Pinellas County, Florida bought the property from the developer and turned it into a public beach access parking lot.

The LP Exotic Sounds from Tiki Gardens features "Polynesian Fantasy...the Tiki Gardens Theme Song", which was written by Ernie Shreeves, one of the "men behind Tiki Gardens".

External links
 A brief history of Tiki Gardens
 Tiki Gardens at LostParks.com
 Pinellas County: Tiki Gardens Indian Shores Beach Access

Defunct amusement parks in Florida
Parks in Pinellas County, Florida
1964 establishments in Florida
1980s disestablishments in Florida